The Sri Sathya Sai Loka Seva Trust (SSSLST) runs educational institutions located in Karnataka, India. There is one campus in Alike, Dakshina Kannada district, and one in Muddenahalli, Chikkaballapur district.

The trust was established as Loka Seva Vrinda in the 1960s by Madiyala Narayan Bhat, who founded the Loka Seva High school in his home village Alike, and another school at Muddenahalli. In 1978, after the untimely death od Narayan Bhat, the schools were taken over by spiritual master Sathya Sai Baba, and he formed a new Trust called Sri Sathya Sai Loka Seva Trust.

Institutions run by the SSSLST include
 Sri Sathya Sai Loka Seva Primary School, Vani Vihar, in Alike
 Sri Sathya Sai Loka Seva High School, in Alike
 Sri Sathya Sai Loka Seva Pre University College, Sathya Sai Vihar, in Alike
 Sri Sathya Sai Loka Seva Vidyakendra, Sathya Sai Vihar, a residential school for boys at Alike
Sri Sathya Sai Loka Seva Gurukulam, Muddenahalli 
Sri Sathya Sai Loka Seva Veda Gurukulam,  Muddenahalli 
Sri Sathya Sai Premamrutha Prakashana, Muddenahalli 
Sri Sathya Sai Loka Seva Prakashana, Muddenahalli 
Sri Sathya Sai Sarla Memorial Hospital, Muddenahalli

The trust also has an orphanage named after Mahatma Gandhi, and a super specialty hospital, both in Alike.

References

External links
http://alikeonline.org/
http://ssslst.org/
http://sssset.edu.in/

Schools in Dakshina Kannada district